The IBEX 35 (IBerian IndEX) is the benchmark stock market index of the Bolsa de Madrid, Spain's principal stock exchange. Initiated in 1992, the index is administered and calculated by Sociedad de Bolsas, a subsidiary of Bolsas y Mercados Españoles (BME), the company which runs Spain's securities markets (including the Bolsa de Madrid). It is a market capitalization weighted index comprising the 35 most liquid Spanish stocks traded in the Madrid Stock Exchange General Index and is reviewed twice annually. Trading on options and futures contracts on the IBEX 35 is provided by MEFF (Mercado Español de Futuros Financieros), another subsidiary of BME.

History 

The IBEX 35 was inaugurated on January 14, 1992, although there are calculated values for the index back to December 29, 1989, where the base value of 3,000 points lies.

Between 2000 and 2007, the index outperformed many of its Western peers, driven by relatively strong domestic economic growth which particularly helped construction and real estate stocks. Consequently, while the record highs to date of the FTSE 100, CAC 40 and AEX, for example, were set during the dot-com bubble in 1999 and 2000, the IBEX 35's all-time maximum of 15,945.70 was reached on November 8, 2007.

The financial crisis of 2007–2008 included extreme volatility in the markets, and saw both the biggest one day percentage fall and rise in the IBEX 35's history. The index closed 7.5% down on January 21, 2008, the second biggest fall in the Spanish equity market since 1987, and rose a record 6.95% three days later.

Rules

Selection
The composition of the IBEX 35 is reviewed twice per year (in June and December) by the so-called Technical Advisory Committee, which consists of "representatives of the stock exchanges and derivatives markets, as well as... renowned experts from the academic and financial fields". If any changes are made, they come into effect the following trading day after the third Friday of the rebalance month In general, at each review, the 35 companies with the highest trading volume in Euros over the previous six months are chosen for inclusion in the index, provided that the average free float market capitalization of the stock is at least 0.3% of the total market cap of the index. Any candidate stock must also have either been traded on at least a third of all trading days in the previous six months, or rank in the top twenty overall in market cap (thus allowing large recently IPO'ed companies to be included).

Weighting

The IBEX 35 is a capitalization-weighted index. The market cap used to calculate the weighting of each constituent is multiplied by a free float factor (ranging from 0.1 to 1) depending on the fraction of shares not subject to block ownership. Any company with 50% or more of its shares considered free float is given a free float factor of 1. Unlike many other European benchmark indices, the weightings of companies in the IBEX 35 are not capped.

As of 2015, international funds based abroad (chiefly in Norway, the United States, the United Kingdom and Qatar) owned 43% of the index, vs. 16% in 1992. Such rate of foreign investment was about 5% above the EU average.

Calculation
The index value (given here as I) of the IBEX 35 index is calculated using the following formula:

with t the moment of calculation; Cap the free float market cap of a specific listing and J a coefficient used to adjust the index on the back of capital increases or other corporate actions so as to ensure continuity. The formula can be adjusted to accommodate changes in index structure, such as the temporary suspension of companies pending news.

Specification 
IBEX Mini futures contracts are traded on the MEFF Renta Variable (MEFF-RV) exchange under the ticker symbol BIBX. The full contract specifiactions for IBEX Mini futures are listed below.

Components
As of June 1, 2021, the following 35 companies make up the index:

Record values

The index reached the following record values:

Annual returns 
The following table shows the annual development of the IBEX 35 since 1992.

Related indices
 IBEX Medium Cap: It is composed by the 20 listed Spanish companies with the largest capitalization after those included in the IBEX 35.
 IBEX Small Cap:  It is composed by the 30 listed Spanish companies with the largest capitalization after those included in the IBEX Medium Cap.
 IBEX Top Dividendo.
 BME Growth: a sub-market of Bolsas y Mercados Españoles (BME) for smaller companies to float shares with a more flexible regulatory system than is applicable to the main market.

Past components 
All changes are due to market capitalisation unless stated otherwise.

 Abengoa 
 Abertis Infraestructuras
 Aceralia (merged with Arbed and Usinor to from Arcelor)
 Agromán
 Aguas de Barcelona
 Altadis
 Amper
 Antena 3 TV
 Arcelor
 Asland (not listed anymore)
 Asturiana de Zinc (not listed anymore)
 Autopistas del Mare Nostrum (renamed as Aurea, and merged in 2003 with ACESA to form Abertis)
 Banco Central (merged with Banco Hispano Americano to form Banco Central Hispano, which later merged with Banco Santander to form Banco Santander Central Hispano, renamed later as Banco Santander)
 Banco Hispano Americano (merged with Banco Central to form Banco Central Hispano, which later merged with Banco Santander to form Banco Santander Central Hispano, renamed later as Banco Santander)
 Banco Popular (acquired by Banco Santander)
 Banesto (acquired by Banco Santander)
 Bankia  (acquired by CaixaBank)
 Bolsas y Mercados Españoles
 Carrefour
 CEPSA
 Cintra (acquired by Ferrovial)
 Continente (merged with Pryca to form Carrefour)
 Corporación Financiera Alba
 Cortefiel
 Cristalería Española (not listed anymore)
 Distribuidora Internacional de Alimentación
 Dragados (acquired by ACS)
 Ebro Industrias Agrícolas (merged with Puleva to form Ebro Puleva, which later was renamed Ebro Foods)
 Energía e Industrias Aragonesas (not listed anymore)
 Ence
 Ercros
 Fadesa (not listed anymore)
 Fomento de Construcciones y Contratas
 FECSA (merged with Endesa)
 GESA (acquired by Endesa)
 Hidrocantábrico (acquired by EDP Group and renamed EDP España)
 Huarte (merged with Obrascón to form Obrascón Huarte, which later merged with Construcciones Lain to form Obrascón Huarte Lain)
 Iberia (merged with British Airways to form IAG)
 Jazztel (acquired by Orange España)
 Masmovil Ibercom
 Mediaset
 Movistar Móviles (acquired by Telefónica)
 NH Hoteles
 Obrascón Huarte Lain
 Picking Pack
 Portland Valderrivas
 Prisa
 Pryca (merged with Continente to form Carrefour)
 Puleva (merged with Ebro Industrias Agricolas to form Ebro Puleva, which later was renamed Ebro Foods)
 Radiotrónica (renamed as Avanzit)
 Sacyr
 Sarrió (not listed anymore)
 Sevillana de Electricidad (acquired by Endesa)
 Sol Meliá
 Técnicas Reunidas
 Telefónica Móviles (acquired by Telefónica)
 Telefónica Publicidad e Información (acquired by Yell)
 Telepizza
 Terra Networks (acquired by Telefónica)
 Tubacex
 Uralita
 Urbis
 Unión Fenosa (acquired by Gas Natural, later renamed as Naturgy)
 Vocento
 Yell Publicidad
 Zardoya Otis
 Zeltia

See also
Economy of Spain

References

External links

 
 Reuters page for .IBEX

 
1992 establishments in Spain
1992 introductions
Spanish stock market indices